Blackpool & Fylde Aero Club v Blackpool Borough Council [1990] EWCA Civ 13 is a leading English contract law case on the issue of offer and acceptance in relation to Call for bids. In it the Court of Appeal of England and Wales decided that tenders and requests for tenders are accompanied by a collateral contract implying that the requestor will give due consideration to any timely bid.

Facts
Blackpool Borough Council ran Blackpool Airport, and gave a licence to a single company to run pleasure flights to and from the airport. Blackpool & Fylde Aero Club had held this licence since 1975, and had been granted it again in 1978 and 1980. In 1983 the current licence was due to expire, and the council sent out letters to seven organisations, including the Aero Club, inviting new tenders to a licence to operate light and heavy aircraft from the airport, requiring a reply to be at the Town Hall 'not later than 12 o'clock noon on Thursday 17 March 1983'.

Three organisations replied, two of which sent in light bids for only the lighter class of aircraft. The Aero Club sent in a significantly higher bid for both classes of aircraft, and placed their offer in the Town Hall letter box at 11 am on the 17th, an hour before the deadline. The Town Clerk's staff failed to empty the letter box at 12 noon as they were expected to do, and as a result the letter was not considered 'delivered' until after the deadline, and the licence was granted to one of the other bidders, Red Rose Helicopters.

After discussions between the Aero Club and the Council it became apparent the letter had been delivered on time, and the Council decided to rectify the situation by declaring the previous round of tenders invalid and inviting the submission of new tenders. At this point Red Rose Helicopters, having consulted their lawyers, informed the Council that they were contractually bound to grant the licence to them. As a result of this the Council withdrew their offer of a second round of tenders, and pursued the contract with Red Rose Helicopters. The case went to the High Court of Justice, where the judge found in favour of the club. The Council appealed, and it was taken to the Court of Appeal, where Roger Toulson QC and Hugh Davies represented the Council, and Michael Shorrock QC and Paul Sylvester represented the Aero Club

Judgment
Bingham LJ's leading judgement read:

Stocker LJ agreed with Bingham LJ, and added:

Farquharson LJ agreed with the other two judges, and made no comment.

See also

English contract law
The Aramis [1989] 1 Lloyd’s Rep 213

Notes

References

English agreement case law
Court of Appeal (England and Wales) cases
1990 in case law
1990 in British law
1990s in Lancashire
History of Blackpool